Mixed lymphocyte reaction (MLR) is a test used by pharmaceutical and biotech organizations to show the safety of a drug or implantable material. It is commonly used as part of the FDA clearance process. Put simply, it is mixing populations of T-lymphocytes (category of white blood cells) together, and measuring the reaction that occurs. Technically, it is an ex-vivo cellular immune assay that occurs between two allogeneic lymphocyte populations (same species but genetically distinct). In a one-way MLR, only one lymphocyte population can respond or proliferate. In a two-way MLR, both populations can proliferate.  MLR’s are performed to assess how T-cells react to external stimuli. T cells are a type of white blood cell that scans for cellular abnormalities and infections. They are essential to human immunity.

History & background
The MLR was first recognized when researchers mixed leukocytes from two unrelated donors in culture.  After several days, lymphocytes underwent blast transformation, DNA synthesis and cellular proliferation in response to the major histocompatibility antigen (MHC Class I and II) differences between the two cell populations designated as Responder and Stimulator cells.  Responder cells proliferated without previous exposure to Stimulator MHC antigens. This response became quantifiable when incorporating radioactive [3H] labelled thymidine or 5-bromo-2’-deoxyuridine (BrdU), into the mixed cell suspension.  This cellular response to the histocompatibility antigens that occurs in the MLR is also involved in cell-mediated immune responses within an individual and offered an in vitro correlate of cellular immune function.  Standard MLR assays were performed in humans and most other animal species.

The leukocyte subpopulations involved in the MLR were first characterized by using cells from neonatally thymectomized and bursectomized chickens. No MLR occurred when the Responder cells came from thymectomized animals, whereas bursectomized chicken leukocytes reacted in culture demonstrating that T-cells were the major cell type in Responder cell populations.

Originally, this assay was used to study possible donor — recipient incompatibilities for graft transplants to help predict better outcomes.  However, the standard for graft matching now depends on a series of HLA-matching done with molecular typing methods.

Principle
The assay set-up consists of purifying responder lymphocytes from peripheral blood, thymus, lymph nodes or spleen and co-culturing with stimulator cells. Stimulator cell populations that also contain T-cells (Two way mixed lymphocyte reaction) will replicate in the presence of the Responder cells, therefore for a One way mixed lymphocyte reaction, stimulator cells are prevented from replicating by irradiation or treatment with mitomycin C, a DNA crosslinker to prevent cell replication.  Maximum measurable cellular proliferation occurs around 5–7 days.

Applications
For research purposes, the MLR cell-based assay continues to provide an in vitro correlate of T cell function. Further characterization of the lymphocytes, accessory cells (dendritic cells, macrophage) and cytokines that participate in the MLR have been done as this assay continues to be used to define mechanisms for understanding cellular immune function in vitro.

References

Immunology
Immune system
Transplantation medicine
T cells